Henry Ramsay (May 18, 1808 in Guilderland, Albany County, New York – July 12, 1886 in Schenectady, New York) was an American civil engineer and for a short time New York State Engineer and Surveyor in 1853.

Life
He was born on May 18, 1808, the son of Frederick Ramsay and Belle (Quackenbush) Ramsay.

He was educated at the Lancaster School in Albany, and graduated from The Albany Academy in 1826. Afterwards he taught school in Albany, New York. Later he became a draftsman, cartographer and civil engineer. In 1831, he married Isabelle Westervelt, and they had nine children.

In 1842, he was appointed Chief Engineer of the Mohawk and Hudson Railroad between Albany and Schenectady, New York. He laid out the course of the New York Central Railroad at Schenectady, to avoid the inclined plane at that terminus. Subsequently, he became Assistant Engineer on the Erie Canal enlargement. In 1849, he moved to Schenectady, and was for several terms City Surveyor.

On December 10, 1853, he was appointed New York State Engineer and Surveyor, to fill the vacancy caused by the resignation of William J. McAlpine, after Wheeler H. Bristol declined to take office.

He died on July 12, 1886 in Schenectady, New York.

Legacy
He endowed the Henry Ramsay Scholarship at The Albany Academy.

Sources

The New York Civil List compiled by Franklin Benjamin Hough (pages 37f; Weed, Parsons and Co., 1858)

1808 births
1886 deaths
New York State Engineers and Surveyors
Politicians from Albany, New York
19th-century American railroad executives
19th-century American engineers
Engineers from New York (state)
Politicians from Schenectady, New York
People from Guilderland, New York
Businesspeople from Schenectady, New York
The Albany Academy alumni